Rachna David (born 22 October 1985) is a Norwegian professional darts player who currently plays in British Darts Organisation events. She has qualified for the 2014 and 2018 BDO World Darts Championship.

Career
David qualified for the 2014 BDO World Darts Championship as a qualifier, facing Julie Gore in the last 16, she lost 2–0. She qualified for the 2018 BDO World Darts Championship as one of the Playoff Qualifiers, facing Deta Hedman in the last 16, she lost 2–0.

World Championship results

BDO
 2014: Last 16 (lost to Julie Gore 0–2)
 2018: Last 16 (lost to Deta Hedman 0–2)

External links
 Profile and stats on Darts Database

Living people
Norwegian darts players
1977 births
British Darts Organisation players
Female darts players
Sportspeople from Oslo
21st-century Norwegian women